Scott Webster may refer to:
 Scott Webster (field hockey)
 Scott Webster (politician)